The Ministry of Internally Displaced Persons from the Occupied Territories, Accommodation and Refugees of Georgia (sakartvelos okupirebuli teritoriebidan gadaadgilebul pirta, gansakhlebisa da ltolvilta saministro), also known as Ministry of Refugees and Accommodation of Georgia was the Georgian government ministry within the Cabinet of Georgia, in charge of regulation of state policies on refugees and asylum seekers, internally displaced persons, repatriates, victims of natural disasters, their accommodation and migration control in the country. It functioned from 1996 until 2018, when the agency's various tasks were assigned to the ministries of Regional Development and Infrastructure, Interior Ministry, and Ministry of Labor, Health and Social Affairs.

The ministry's last head was Sozar Subari.

Structure
The ministry is headed by the minister, aided by the First Deputy and three deputy ministers. The ministry oversees activities in development and implementation of state policy under Article 1, Paragraph 17 of the Law of Georgia on the "Structure of the Government, its Authority and the Rule of Operation". It has four functioning chapters in: 
Adjara and Samegrelo-Zemo Svaneti; 
Imereti, Guria, Racha-Lechkhumi and Kvemo Svaneti
Kvemo Kartli, Mtskheta-Mtianeti and Kakheti
Shida Kartli and Samtskhe-Javakheti

According to Georgian authorities, Georgia has had around 251,000 IDPs from Georgian–Abkhazian and Georgian–Ossetian conflicts, the number which increased by nearly 26,000 due to 2008 Georgia-Russia conflict. The ministry found itself in the media spotlight when it tried to relocate 1,500 IDPs from Tbilisi to rural areas offering $10,000 or alternative housing to each family affected by conflict.

See also
Cabinet of Georgia

References

Internally Displaced Persons from the Occupied Territories, Accommodation and Refugees
2010 establishments in Georgia (country)
Ministries established in 2010
Georgia, Internally Displaced Persons from the Occupied Territories, Accommodation and Refugees
2018 disestablishments in Georgia (country)